The Mérindol massacre took place in 1545, when Francis I of France ordered the Waldensians of the village of Mérindol to be punished for heresy. Provençal and papal soldiers killed hundreds or even thousands of Waldensian villagers.

Arrêt de Mérindol
Outside the Piedmont of Italy, the Waldensians joined the local Protestant churches in Bohemia, France and Germany. They had regrouped in the Luberon and followed their religions in a carefully concealed manner. As Lutherans started to penetrate their region, the Waldensians' activities came under scrutiny by the French government. The Waldensians became more militant, constructing fortified areas, as in Cabrières, or attacking an abbey. 

The Parlement of Provence issued the "Arrêt de Mérindol" on 18 November 1541. This was confirmed in 1545 by Francis I after a series of appeals eventually failed. In April, Maynier raised an army of Provençal troops, who were joined by forces from the papal Comtat Venaissin against the Waldensians of Mérindol and Cabrières.

The massacres

The leaders in the 1545 massacres were Jean Maynier d'Oppède, First President of the parlement of Provence, and Antoine Escalin des Aimars, who was returning from the Italian Wars with 2,000 veterans, the Bandes de Piémont. Escalin was on his way to fight against the English in the area of Boulogne after returning from an embassy to Constantinople, where he was French Ambassador to the Ottoman Empire. While in Marseilles in 1545, he was requested to assist Jean Maynier d'Oppède in the repression. 

These soldiers took the villages of Mérindol and Cabrières and also devastated neighbouring Waldensian villages. Historians have estimated that the soldiers killed hundreds to thousands of people. They captured survivors and sent hundreds of men to forced labour in the French galleys. In total, they destroyed between 22 and 28 villages. The execution of one young man, a servant, might well have been the first example of execution by firing squad in Europe for causes of ideology.

In the aftermath, Pope Paul III approved of the actions taken; the Pope rewarded Maynier with Imperial honours. When Henry II took the French throne, however, he promised to investigate the affair. The Parliament of Paris tried the leaders of the attacks, but eventually acquitted all but one. The massacres probably influenced the Waldensians to become more attached to the Calvinist churches.

Notes

1545 in France
History of Christianity in France
Conflicts in 1545
Persecution of the Waldensians
Massacres in France
History of Vaucluse
French Wars of Religion
Francis I of France
Massacres committed by France
Massacres in 1545